Pulse is Megumi Hayashibara's fifth album, released on December 21, 1994.
A single version was released earlier excluding karaoke tracks of the songs.

Track listing

1994 albums
Megumi Hayashibara albums